Adela eldorada is a moth of the family Adelidae or fairy longhorn moths. It was described by Powell in 1969. It is found from Washington to California.

References

Adelidae
Moths described in 1969
Endemic fauna of the United States
Insects of the United States